South Carolina Highway 324 (SC 324) is a  state highway in the U.S. state of South Carolina. The highway connects York with the Rock Hill area.

Route description
SC 324 begins at an intersection with SC 5 Business (SC 5 Bus.) and SC 161 Bus. (East Liberty Street) in York, York County. It passes Harold C. Johnson Elementary School before leaving the city limits. The highway travels in a fairly southeasterly direction. It intersects SC 322 (McConnells Highway). Farther along, ti crosses over Stony Fork. SC 324 continues traveling through rural areas of the county and crosses some railroad tracks before meeting its eastern terminus, an intersection with SC 72/SC 121 (Saluda Road).

Major intersections

See also

References

External links

SC 324 at Virginia Highways' South Carolina Highways Annex

324
Transportation in York County, South Carolina